In geometry, the elongated pentagonal gyrobicupola is one of the Johnson solids. As the name suggests, it can be constructed by elongating a pentagonal gyrobicupola by inserting a decagonal prism between its congruent halves. Rotating one of the pentagonal cupolae through 36 degrees before inserting the prism yields an elongated pentagonal orthobicupola .

Formulae
The following formulae for volume and surface area can be used if all faces are regular, with edge length a:

References

External links
 

Johnson solids